Beaumont-du-Ventoux is a commune in the Vaucluse department in the Provence-Alpes-Côte d'Azur region in southeastern France. This commune wine co-operative "cave" draws on local vineyards. The overall area is at the foothill of the famous Mont Ventoux, a famous cycle stage of the Tour de France.

Monuments and sights
 Château de Beaumont le Vieux, ruined 10th century castle

See also
 Communes of the Vaucluse department

References

Communes of Vaucluse